The French rugby league championship has been the major rugby league tournament for semi-professional and professional clubs in France since the sport was introduced to the country in the 1930s.

Except for the first season, a play-off structure leading to a championship final has always been used to determine the fate of the championship. Because the French rugby league championship has several divisions where the teams will change each year depending on final standings and relegation/promotion there have been many teams in the French rugby league championship since its inception.

The championship is divided into several divisions; the top league is currently titled Elite One Championship (French: Le Championnat de France Elite).

Divisions

Elite One Championship

Elite Two Championship

Lower Leagues 
Below the Championship Divisions, the National Division 1 and National Division 2 are the third and fourth tier respectively.

List of finals

Champions by club

Footnotes 
 Won title on points: no play-off was used
 Match abandoned after six minutes after the beginning due to fighting; no championship awarded.

Books
 Le Rugby à XIII le plus français du monde −1934 to 1996– by Louis Bonnery,
 The Forbidden game by Mike Rylance.

See also

Rugby league in France
France national rugby league team
France women's national rugby league team
Elite One Championship
Elite Two Championship
National Division 1
National Division 2
Lord Derby Cup
Coupe Falcou
Paul Dejean Cup
French rugby league system

References

External links

Infostreize
Le monde du rugby à XIII

Rugby league competitions in France
1934 establishments in France
Sports leagues established in 1934